Chalkeia (Greek: Χάλκεια) is a former municipality in Aetolia-Acarnania, West Greece, Greece. Since the 2011 local government reform it is part of the municipality Nafpaktia, of which it is a municipal unit. The municipal unit has an area of 114.189 km2. Population 2,397 (2011). The seat of the municipality was in Trikorfo.

Subdivisions
The municipal unit Chalkeia is subdivided into the following communities (constituent villages in brackets):
Trikorfo
Ano Vasiliki
Vasiliki (Kato Vasiliki, Perama)
Gavrolimni
Galatas (Galatas, Kryoneri)
Kalavrouza (Kato Kalavrouza, Kalavrouza)
Perithori

References

Populated places in Aetolia-Acarnania
Nafpaktia